T.U.F.F. Puppy is an American animated television series created by Butch Hartman for Nickelodeon. It premiered on October 2, 2010, on Nickelodeon along with Planet Sheen, which premiered a half hour earlier. T.U.F.F. Puppy is Hartman's third animated series for Nickelodeon, after The Fairly OddParents and Danny Phantom and also before Bunsen Is a Beast. The series was cancelled after three seasons and aired its final episode on April 4, 2015.

The first two seasons consist of 26 episodes each, and the third season consisted of eight episodes,  for a total of 60 episodes.

Plot
The show's character is a white dog named Dudley Puppy, who works as a spy for an organization called T.U.F.F. (Turbo Undercover Fighting Force). His partner is a cat named Kitty Katswell. Other helpers are The Chief and Keswick. The series takes place in the fictional city of Petropolis (distinct from the Brazilian city of Petrópolis, which is named after Pedro II of Brazil), which is populated by anthropomorphic animals. As a member of T.U.F.F., Dudley Puppy helps Kitty Katswell protect Petropolis from various villains, such as Verminious Snaptrap and his crime organization D.O.O.M., The Chameleon, and Bird Brain.

Episodes

Characters

Main

T.U.F.F. 
The Turbo Undercover Fighting Force (T.U.F.F.) is an organization that protects Petropolis from crime.

 Dudley Puppy (voiced by Jerry Trainor) – The heart and soul of T.U.F.F. even though he's depicted as an idiotic, air headed, hyperactive and loud white and black, mixed-breed dog who usually wears nothing more than a black T-shirt. Despite his lack of common sense he has been proven to be exceedingly clever relative to most puppies (i.e. tricking the Chameleon into morphing into a mouse so that Agent Jumbo would jump on him out of fear), Dudley was first discovered by T.U.F.F. when he followed his recently acquired chew toy into D.O.O.M.'s headquarters where he unknowingly defeated Francisco, Bad Dog, and Leather Teddy at the time when Kitty Katswell was pursuing Verminious Snaptrap. Keswick's DNA analysis shows that Dudley is the "perfect mix of every breed of dog known to man". Since each breed of dog has a special trait (like a beagle's appearance, a Bloodhound's sensitive nose, a Greyhound's speed, German Shepherd's brave heart, the fighting abilities of a Chinese Fighting Dog (Shar-Pei) the buff chest and arms of an Alaskan Malamute, the French-speaking of a French Poodle, the leaping abilities of a Springer. etc.), Dudley's overall natural skills makes him a formidable agent and he is made Kitty Katswell's partner. Dudley also has bad habits of being gluttonous and immature. Despite this eccentric personality, his bravery and advanced natural physical skills are an asset to T.U.F.F. in times of need and he can be pretty sensible when needed. He usually comes up with clever plans to stop his enemies, and he becomes more and more noble as time goes by. His catchphrase is "Hi gee gee", and he often says it whenever he's ready to jet out of the area. A running gag consists of the fact he reads poorly and cannot spell or write. However, there have been many times that Dudley has demonstrated that he has these abilities. In the episode "Snap Dad", it is revealed that Dudley's mother is still dating; the whereabouts of Dudley's father have not been revealed.
 Kitty Katswell (voiced by Grey DeLisle) – A female cat who is one of T.U.F.F.'s best agents. She is also Dudley's partner and best friend. Skilled in various fighting styles and use of firearms, is short-tempered, and easily startled, Kitty Katswell is a force to be reckoned with. A few episodes mention that her birthdays as a child have been horrendous, she spent eight years in Secret Agent College, and has a twin sister named Katty who is in jail. Being a cat, she naturally fought with Dudley (who is a dog) when he first joined the agency (usually in an immature manner). However, as episodes progress, she becomes more affectionate to Dudley as he presents his courage, skill, nobility, and respect for her and T.U.F.F. more often. Later they stop fighting and become heartfelt friends. She wears a dark gray spy suit over her white turtle neck, white high heeled boots, a white hairband, and white gloves (unless she is wearing a disguise). She occasionally gives into her animal instincts like chasing mice and birds, clawing things, or leaving dead mice on doorsteps.
 Chief Herbert Dumbrowski (voiced by Daran Norris) – A tough and strict but good-natured flea who is the leader of T.U.F.F. Subsequently, he's Dudley's employer and (although he's usually getting angry at Dudley and yelling at him) he seems to be somewhat proud of him as an agent. In "Internal Affairs", it is revealed that he used to be T.U.F.F.'s top field agent until he retired and became (or was most-likely awarded) the chief of T.U.F.F. The episode also revealed that he has a bionic foot, has short-term memory loss, and uses a toupée (all due to his aging).
 Keswick (voiced by Jeff Bennett) – The primary inventor and scientist of T.U.F.F. HQ, although whatever he invents is somewhat worthless due to the fact that it shoots acid, is too dangerous, or is just downright unpredictable. Many of his ray guns have weird results, to which he responds with frustration towards himself. Usually, when he speaks, he has a stutter. Dudley is somewhat close to him although Dudley finds him and his random abilities odd, making him curious about his species. Oddly enough, Keswick's species is simply the fictional "Keswick". Subsequently, it is shown that he has gills, webbed feet, looks like a labradoodle, wombat, or a prairie dog, and has the ability to lay eggs. In "Pup Daddy", it is shown that he goes through animal phases. In "The Doomies", it is shown that he is not on good terms with his parents and in "Dog Dish", it is revealed that he has a brother-in-law named Stan. This confirms he has a sister. In "Love Bird", it is known that his mom did not like him dating because relationships are a lot of work and that the girl will lose her girlish figure. In "Crusin' for a Brusin'", it is shown that he cannot sing well because of his stuttering. It is also revealed in "Thunder Dog" that he is exceedingly afraid of girls. In "True Spies", it is revealed that Keswick is an alien from Keswickia who is wanted by the Keswickian Police for cooking stinky fish at work, as his planet is very strict. Keswick's voice is based on that of Julius Kelp from The Nutty Professor.
 T.U.F.F. Troopers – The foot soldiers of T.U.F.F. who resemble older versions of Dudley.

Also in T.U.F.F. are various personnel that appear as background characters whether as agents, office workers, and/or scientists. Some of the minor members of T.U.F.F. that have been identified or mentioned include:

 Agent Amoeba – A microscopic T.U.F.F. Agent who the Chief mentioned to have helped him start Spackle and Grout Day in "Lie Like a Dog".
 Agent Ant – An ant T.U.F.F. Agent who was incorrectly paired with Agent Anteater in "Match Me If You Can".
 Agent Anteater – An anteater T.U.F.F. Agent who was incorrectly paired with Agent Ant in "Match Me If You Can".
 Agent Bacon – A pig T.U.F.F. Agent that is seen in "Super Duper Crime Busters". It is implied that he has a hobby of knitting.
 Agent Big Bad Wolf – A wolf T.U.F.F. agent who was incorrectly paired with Agent Three Little Pigs in "Match Me If You Can".
 Agent Bossy – A cow T.U.F.F. Agent that is seen in "Mall Rat" and "The Wrong Stuff". She tends to surf the internet to find meat that would be insensitive to her.
 Agent Bull – A cattle T.U.F.F. Agent that is seen in "Happy Howl-O-Ween". He is based on the stereotype that bulls get angry when they see the color red.
 Agent Goldfish – A T.U.F.F. Agent who only appeared in "Thunder Dog" so far. She has a fear of toilets.
 Agent Groundhog (voiced by Jeff Bennett) – A T.U.F.F. Agent who first made a cameo in "Hot Dog". He resides under an office printer and is the one who tells about the end of winter.
 Agent Guinea Pig – A T.U.F.F. Agent who only appeared in "Candy Cane-Ine" so far. He was seen running on a hamster wheel.
 Agent Hammerhead – A hammerhead shark T.U.F.F. Agent who was first seen in "Puppy Unplugged".
 Agent Jumbo (voiced by Grey DeLisle) – An elephant T.U.F.F. Agent who has a fear of mice which would result in her jumping up when she sees them and accidentally crushing anyone.
 Agent Kid – A goat T.U.F.F. Agent who was first seen in "Pup Daddy". He is known to eat cans including the ones that are in the recycling bin.
 Agent Moby (voiced by Matt Taylor) – A whale T.U.F.F. Agent who appeared in "A Doomed Christmas". Like Agent Jumbo, Agent Moby also has a tendency to accidentally crush the Chief.
 Agent Mouse – A mouse T.U.F.F. Agent who was incorrectly paired with Agent Snake in "Match Me If You Can" where he was swallowed whole by Agent Snake.
 Agent Nutz (voiced by Jeff Bennett) – A squirrel T.U.F.F. Agent who would always freak out about something completely random and blast it with his laser.
 Agent Scarecrow – A T.U.F.F. Agent that is not based on any animal. So far, he has only been seen in "Mom-A-Geddon".
 Agent Seabiscuit – A horse T.U.F.F. Agent who first appeared in "The Dog Who Cried Fish". He is shown to be offended when somebody claimed that they can "eat like a horse".
 Agent Sea Cucumber – A T.U.F.F. Agent that appeared in "Acting T.U.F.F".
 Agent Skunk – A T.U.F.F. Agent that appeared in "T.U.F.F. Choices" where he is adverse to being waken up.
 Agent Snake – A snake T.U.F.F. Agent who was incorrectly paired with Agent Mouse in "Match Me If You Can" where he ended up swallowing Agent Mouse whole.
 Agent Three Little Pigs – Three pig T.U.F.F. Agents who were incorrectly paired with Agent Big Bad Wolf in "Match Me If You Can".
 George Looney – A loon that works as a janitor at T.U.F.F. and is a descendant of Petropolis' founder Daniel Boone Looney. George Looney has so far been only seen in "Legal Beagle".
 Percival - A pig who used to work for Stink Bug until he got fired for giving away Stink Bug's evil stinky odor plan, but he works for T.U.F.F. as a new intern and arrests Stink Bug by having him make license plates.
 Sally Mander – A salamander that works as a secretary at T.U.F.F. Her name is a pun on "salamander".
 Scary Jimmy – A bull that works as a janitor at T.U.F.F. He is a very suspicious and strange person. Scary Jimmy is implied to be somewhat of a shut-in, mentally unstable, paranoid and potentially harmful. He has stated that he can memorize the backs of people's heads.
 Tammy (voiced by Grey DeLisle) – A rabbit that works as a secretary at T.U.F.F.

Main villains
 Verminious Snaptrap (voiced by Matt Taylor) – A rat who is the leader of the Diabolical Order of Mayhem. Despite being a rat, he is allergic to cheese which causes him to swell up. Like his nemesis Dudley Puppy, he is hyperactive, immature, and airheaded. However, unlike Dudley, he doesn't show intellectual potential. He is often easily frustrated when his fellow D.O.O.M. members do something foolish. A running gag is Snaptrap throwing Larry, Dudley, Kitty, or others into his shark tank (which never actually kills any of them). In "Operation: Happy Birthday", it is revealed that he still lives with his mother. Later on in "Dog Dish", it is revealed that his mother buys all of Snaptrap's evil gadgets. That same episode shows that he has a blog, and that he uses his gadgets for incredibly stupid plans such as sneaking into movie theaters. Although, on some occasions, he has shown to be able to do true evil, such as launching the entire town into the sun (as seen in "Mall Rat" when he faked his reform). After most defeats, he shouts "I will now plot my revenge!" In "Forget Me Mutt", it is shown that he is verbally abused by his mother. In "Mind Trap", he is shown to go dumpster diving for food.
 The Chameleon (voiced by Daran Norris impersonating Peter Lorre) – A chameleon in a molecular transformation suit which allows him to shapeshift into virtually any disguise or inanimate object. In "Doom-mates", his name is pronounced "The Cham-a-leon" as a running gag he wanted to get revenge on Kitty Katswell by blowing her up nine times but Dudley heroically thwarted his evil plan, thus saving her. He talks in a Swedish accent and eats any bug he sees, a trait used against him several times. His relationship with D.O.O.M. seems rather strained, since he tends to work separately from the others and once planned to trick them and T.U.F.F. to destroy each other. He said he wanted to go to D.O.O.M.'s weekly ice cream socials, but he was never invited. The Chameleon later teamed up with D.O.O.M. in "Mission: Really Big Mission," ending with him being blasted into space (which he somehow survived). As a running gag, he often tries to wear some type of eyewear only to have his eyes go around or through them, as his chameleon eyes constantly bug around and look in separate directions, which creeps Dudley out, as seen in "Doom-Mates." He can sometimes be very random when disguised. Whenever he's in disguise, he tends to say random things relating to his disguise (For example, in "Internal Affairs," disguised as General Warhog tells the soldiers "semper fi" and "remember the Alamo"). Oddly, whenever the story has him using a disguise for a long time as a major plot point, his voice is never disguised, despite him being able to disguise it during the short disguises in other episodes (although this may be because he experiences a sort of discomfort by mimicking voices, forcing him to do it rarely, but this is just speculation, and it has yet to be explained). Another oddity is that Dudley can never tell when the Chameleon is disguised or what he is disguised as, despite him having the sharp nose of a bloodhound (possibly the Chameleon can disguise his smell, too). If the Chameleon is splashed with liquid while in disguise, his suit will short circuit and he will be forced to return to normal (although he notes that it is only on the outside, as inside, it makes him feel bloated). Also, his suit is wired into his brain and if it is removed, he will have no choice but return to his normal form.
 Bird Brain (voiced by Rob Paulsen) – Bird Brain is an evil blue-bottomed booby genius who can't fly with his wings (something he always forgets). Despite his species name's origin which is from the Spanish word "bobo" or "stupid", he is more intelligent and competent than both Snaptrap and the Chameleon. Bird Brain seems to be quite intelligent and capable at his job. Like Snaptrap, he is very easily frustrated by his comrades, whom tend to be genuinely much more foolish than Snaptrap's smarter and more villainous gang. In "Thunder Dog" it is revealed that he is prematurely bald. In "A Doomed Christmas", it is revealed that although he looks old he is only 23. In "Hush Puppy", it is revealed that he lost his hair at a young age due to stress.

Snaptrap's Henchmen or D.O.O.M.

 Larry (voiced by Jeff Bennett) – A shrew who is Verminious Snaptrap's brother-in-law (Larry's married to Snaptrap's sister) and one of his three main henchmen. Despite being considered dim-witted by Snaptrap, Larry is the second smartest and most intelligent of his three main henchmen. Larry often infuriates Snaptrap by talking back to him or, on a few occasions, making mistakes, which results in him either getting blasted by a laser or thrown into the shark tank. In "Doom and Gloom", the recent abuse from Snaptrap and him not listening to Larry's advice not to tell T.U.F.F. of his plans causes Larry to quit and forms his own business, G.L.O.O.M. (short for Genius Larry's Order of Mayhem) with Ollie and Francisco where Larry operated under the alias of Murray. While planning a plot to turn off Petropolis' power and cover the whole city in fog emitted from a fog machine, Larry had G.L.O.O.M's temporary headquarters in the sewing room owned by Snaptrap's mom. With help from Snaptrap, Dudley and Kitty were able to stop Larry's plot and get Larry, Ollie, and Francisco back onto D.O.O.M. In "True Spies", it is revealed that Snaptrap actually doesn't hate Larry, but only mistreated him because he believes he has much potential to be malignant.
 Ollie (voiced by Jeff Bennett) – A sensible and smart British possum who is one of Snaptrap's main henchmen. Ollie is Snaptrap's voice of reason whom he often ignores. A recurring gag in the series is that Ollie is the one who accidentally gives Snaptrap something cheese related either forgetting about his boss's cheese allergy or Snaptrap idiotically forgetting it himself. Another gag involving him is that Ollie is the one who gives Snaptrap the ideas for his evil plans due to a misunderstanding that Snaptrap has already come up with a plan only to reveal it is just something he likes to do (i.e. in "Iron Mutt", he thinks that Snaptrap has planned to trap the principal of the local high school and impersonate her due to the large mousetrap and the dress he's wearing which Snaptrap, who just really liked wearing dresses, quickly covers up by saying that was his plan). In "True Spies", it is revealed that Ollie is really French, but uses a British accent to make himself sound smart.
 Francisco (voiced by Daran Norris) – An alligator who is one of Snaptrap's three main henchmen. He is also the only one of Snaptrap's henchman who seems to take villainy seriously. In "Dog Dish", he kept trying to convince Snaptrap to use the invisibility helmet for more evil deeds than sneaking into the movies. In "True Spies", it is revealed that Francisco's real name is Francesca because his parents wanted a girl.
 Bad Dog (voiced by Daran Norris) – A pit bull and one of Snaptrap's henchmen. He is often seen with a black torn sleeveless shirt with a skull on it (similar to Punisher's T-shirt). Bad Dog is often paired up with Leather Teddy. He stops appearing after the first season.
 Leather Teddy – A leather clad blue bear and one of Snaptrap's henchmen that wears an eyepatch (though the first episode shows that he still has an eye under the eyepatch). He wields bear traps on chains for weapons. Leather Teddy's outfit gives him the appearance of a biker. He is often paired up with Bad Dog. He stops appearing after the first season.
 The Mole (voiced by Matt Taylor) – A mole agent who is Snaptrap's master of infiltration. He stops appearing after the first season.
Skunk – A skunk who is one of Snaptrap's henchmen. Strangely, he only appears in "Cruisin' with a Bruisin".
Snaptrap is also shown to have other, unnamed minions over the course of the show, but they never have major roles, and eventually stopped appearing.

Bird Brain's Henchmen

 Zippy (voiced by Grey DeLisle) – Zippy is Bird Brain's scatterbrained hummingbird sidekick/partner who constantly encourages him to fly, despite the fact that his subspecies is incapable of it (although real-life boobies are able to fly). Whenever Owl and Bat would say "Who?" and "Where?" respectively, Zippy occasionally adds "Why?" which often infuriates Bird Brain.
Owl (voiced by Jeff Bennett) – Owl is one of Bird Brain's henchmen upon being hired by Zippy. He and Bat are both very incompetent where he would often infuriate his boss by saying "Who?".
Bat (voiced by Daran Norris impersonating Bela Lugosi) – Bat is one of Bird Brain's henchmen upon them being hired by Zippy. He and Owl are both very incompetent where he would infuriate his boss by saying "Where?" in response to the orders given to him. Bat is suggested to be blind since he always seen wearing dark sunglasses (although he occasionally does his job exactly as told implying that he has some vision and he is apparently slightly smarter than Owl). Bird Brain seems to like Bat more because at one point in "Thunder Dog", Bat did his job exactly as he was told without saying his usual "Where?" This surprised Bird Brain while Owl idiotically said his usual "Who?", as Bird Brain threatened to hit Owl with a boulder.
Duck (voiced by Jeff Bennett) – A duck who is one of Bird Brain's more recent henchmen as seen in "Puppy Unplugged". He can speak in both duck and human languages. Whenever someone says his name, other people "duck" for cover because they think that something is coming right at them. In "Puppy Unplugged", it is revealed that his real name is "Skip", causing everyone to skip around happily.
 Ewe (voiced by Grey DeLisle) – A female sheep who is one of Bird Brain's more recent henchmen as seen in "Monkey Business".
Fly – A small purple fly who is one of Bird Brain's henchmen as seen in "Bad Eggs" (although he never signed the application, and is in fact just a housefly). When Bird Brain says his name, his henchmen start flying around him.
 Peck Me – A goose who is one of Bird Brain's henchmen in "Barking Tall". When Bird Brain says his name, his henchmen start pecking him.
 Holy Cow - A cow who is another one of Bird Brain's henchmen. He was first seen in "Love Bird". His first appearance is when Bird Brain said "Holy cow!" Holy Cow thinks Bird Brain called him, but Bird Brain said "Not you, Holy Cow." His second appearance is when Bird Brain calls him again, but Bird Brain says, "No, get back in the minivan." He breaks the fourth wall when Bird Brain calls him one more time, but Bird Brain says "Don't".)

Recurring  and one-off characters

Other villains

 R.I.T.A. (voiced by Grey DeLisle) – R.I.T.A. is a super-intelligent toaster created by Keswick. She stops Snaptrap and the Chameleon, but when Keswick attempts to unplug her because T.U.F.F. is eco-friendly, R.I.T.A. turns evil and attempts to take over the city. With the help of Keswick's hologram, Dudley makes her fall to her death on a cliff and into a lake. Some of her lines and actions suggest that she (at least in part) is a parody of the evil computer H.A.L. from 2001: A Space Odyssey.
 Snowflake and Slush (voiced by Mary Birdsong and Dave Boat respectively) – Snowflake and Slush are evil rabbit siblings who dress up as vegetables and cheat in events by eliminating and kidnapping the winners. Snowflake is the mastermind of the two, while Slush possesses little to no intelligence, who in his sister's words is "dumber than a box of hair" (she should know, she used to skate with one, and claims it was smarter than him). Despite his immense stupidity, he is very competent with Snowflake's plan and when it is ruined, he is shown to be just as angry at the failure and desperate to escape as Snowflake is.
 Dr. Rabies and Madame Catastrophe (voiced by Jerry Trainor and Grey DeLisle respectively) – Two villains who resemble Dudley Puppy and Kitty Katswell except that their evil twins wear eye patches and have goatees on their chins. They only appeared in "The Doomies".
 Mad Cow – Mad Cow is an angry bull who first appeared in "Snap Dad" trying to escape from jail. Mad Cow's escape was a success at the time when Snaptrap was a T.U.F.F. Agent and dating Peg. He tried to escape Petropolis Prison with Snaptrap's help as seen in "Dog Dish", but he was stopped by Dudley and Kitty. His name is a reference to "mad cow disease".
 Crazy Horse (voiced by Daran Norris) – Crazy Horse is a horse who uses chainsaws (he even whinnies while using chainsaws). He tried to escape Petropolis Prison with Snaptrap's help as seen in "Dog Dish", but he was stopped by Dudley and Kitty. He ends up getting Snaptrap as his cellmate. His name is a reference to the Native American leader Crazy Horse.
Wild Turkey – Wild Turkey is a turkey who tried to escape Petropolis Prison with Snaptrap's help as seen in "Dog Dish", but he was stopped by Dudley and Kitty.
 Kung Pow Chicken – Kung Pow Chicken is a chicken talented in martial arts. He tried to escape Petropolis Prison with Snaptrap's help as seen in "Dog Dish", but he got arrested thanks to Kitty. His name is a pun on Kung Pao Chicken.
 Jack Rabbit (voiced by Daran Norris) – Jack Rabbit is a former elite T.U.F.F. agent and Kitty's former partner who is a parody of James Bond, he had turned evil, attempting to drain secret agents' brains with his organization S.T.U.F.F. (short for Super Turbo Undercover Fighting Force) and sell their secrets to villains along with the building to earn money. Greedy, clever, arrogant, and dishonest, Jack attempted to lure Kitty into a trap so he could steal her information (mostly to get money from Snaptrap), but was defeated by Dudley and Keswick. Judging by a line from Kitty in "The Wrong Stuff", she and Jack were supposedly a couple once. He and Snaptrap are arrested by Dudley and Keswick. He later attempted to woo Kitty (who was actually Dudley, and had previously used a Brain-Swapping device on himself earlier) into letting him steal the T.U.F.F. computer database. He was once again defeated, but it is likely he will return to plot his revenge on T.U.F.F.
 The Caped Cod (voiced by Chris Parnell and later by Mick Wingert) – The Caped Cod is a crazy cod who thinks he is the ruler of the seven seas, and thinks that Dudley is the king of the surface world and talks to inanimate objects at the bottom of the sea that he thinks are his subjects. He once tried to flood Petropolis but was stopped by Kitty and Dudley and was put in an aquarium for the criminally insane. His name is a reference to Cape Cod, Massachusetts. In "Cold Fish", the Caped Cod escapes from his incarceration and tried to flood Petropolis again in order to make it part of his kingdom by melting the Riceberg Ice Bird Iceberg. He also did this to get revenge on Bryce Riceberg because she didn't invite him to her wedding (which he did, and the Caped Cod just never read his mail. He later returned to his plan, as the Ricebergs were serving fish) and they were best friends in middle school. The Caped Cod was once again defeated in the end.
Stink Bug (voiced by Carlos Alazraqui) – The Stink Bug is Petropolis' worst smelling villain who was kicked out of Petropolis for smelling so bad. He is very rude and cruel to his intern Percival (who kept suggesting for Stink Bug to take a bath). Because of his very strong odor, Dudley's super sensitive snout made him powerless. When it came to stinking up Petropolis with a combined odor of the stuff he stole, Percival gave away the name of the Stink Bug's device causing Stink Bug to fire him and send him down the trap door. In order to combat Stink Bug Dudley caught Keswick's cold. Dudley defeated Stink Bug and was taken to jail by Percival.
 Lunch Lady Bug (voiced by Candi Milo) – A ladybug who worked as a lunch lady at Petropolis High School and makes disgusting food that only Dudley likes. It was even mentioned that she received warning letters from the Health Department involving her dishes. She tried to destroy everyone at the High School Reunion only to be defeated by Dudley and Kitty. A goof is that she is depicted with eight legs when ladybugs have six legs.
 F.L.O.P.P. – Short for Fiendish League of Potential Perpetrators, F.L.O.P.P. is a criminal organization that would often do minor criminal activities and use the tool shed at a golf course. A running gag about them is that they find dangerous weapons that are left in the lost and found by Verminious Snaptrap.
Meerkat (voiced by Daran Norris) – A meerkat who is the eccentric leader of F.L.O.P.P. with a black cowboy hat. In "Bluff Puppy", it is revealed that he is diabetic.
 Wanna-Bee (voiced by Jerry Trainor) – A bee who is a member of F.L.O.P.P. His name is a play on "wannabe". In "The Spelling Bee", Wanna-Bee temporarily operated his own stand-alone villain career as the Spelling Bee where he was capturing spelling bee competitors while the rest of F.L.O.P.P. were on jury duty.
 Escape Goat (voiced by Matt Taylor) – A goat who is a member of F.L.O.P.P. and is an escape artist. His name is a play on "scapegoat".
Fiddler Crab – A fiddle-playing crab who is a member of F.L.O.P.P. So far, he has only appeared in "Top Dog".
 Missing Lynx – A lynx who is mentioned as a member of F.L.O.P.P. as he is "missing as usual". Missing Lynx's name is a play on "missing link".
 Bluffalo – A buffalo that is a member of F.L.O.P.P. in "Bluff Puppy". He has a tendency to tell bluffs. Bluffalo is also an old friend of Meerkat.
 Quacky the Duck (voiced by Matt Taylor) – Quacky the Duck was originally a kid show host seen in "Kid Stuff". Dudley, Chief, and Keswick all watch Quacky's show, but Dudley is his biggest fan and the captain of his unofficial fan club. When his show was cancelled, Quacky wanted to get revenge by blasting the TV Chairman with a nuclear missile with Dudley and Kitty tied to it. He was arrested by Dudley and his show is now in prison where he has Revenge Rabbit show viewers how to get revenge on the jury that convicts anyone. In "Lucky Duck", Quacky the Duck is released from prison and establishes a restaurant. In "Quack in the Box", he and Sharing Moose are released from prison and start a fast food chain. They try to get revenge on Dudley by framing him for taking out the competition against other fast food chains using action figures of characters from Quacky's show. However, his plan was discovered and he was stopped once again. He later appeared again in "Lights, Camera, Quacktion" when it was revealed that he lost his TV show and seek revenge on T.U.F.F. by framing Dudley, Kitty, Keswick and the Chief into thinking that he was going to make a movie and having them commit serious crimes such as stealing a truck, steal gold from Fort Ox, and loading them into a ship to Canada. His plan almost worked, but was foiled by T.U.F.F. Quacky makes another appearance in "Quacky Birthday", where he wants to shut T.U.F.F. down once and for all. He pretends he has a party room for Dudley's birthday party. Because of that, Dudley lets him and the Sharing Moose to take things from stores without arresting them. Once the T.U.F.F. agents are in his "party place", Quacky locks them in with dynamites. However, Dudley manages to save T.U.F.F. and arrest him. In "T.U.F.F. Cookies", Quacky the Duck hires Dudley to help promote his Animal Quackers. He was thwarted again by Dudley. In "The Good, the Bad, and the Quacky", Quacky the Duck hosts a TV show that pits Dudley, Kitty, Keswick, and Chief against Verminious Snaptrap, Chameleon, and Birdbrain. When the game started to get deadly, T.U.F.F. had to work together with Verminious Snaptrap, Chameleon, and Birdbrain to survive the game show and defeat Quacky.
 The Sharing Moose (voiced by Jeff Bennett) – A moose that is the buff and violent best friend of Quacky the Duck. He constantly reminds viewers important stuff like "Not to commit internet fraud" or "never leave town without telling your parole officer or he will hunt you down". The Sharing Moose's actor appears to be doing community service since he seems to be from jail.
 Katty Katswell – Kitty Katswell's evil twin sister. She was first mentioned in "Diary of a Mad Cat" where it is stated that she is in prison. As a criminal, she commits crimes such as armed robbery, grand theft auto, and insurance fraud. Katty debuted in "A Tale of Two Kitties" where she escapes from prison to take revenge on her sister who put her in prison. Katty does this by swapping places with her own sister to steal 24 carat Golden Fishbowl from the Petropolis Art Museum exhibit in which Dudley and Kitty have assignments to protect this. Dudley didn't know that where his partner was swapped by Katty. Katty was eventually found out, ends up defeated by Dudley and Kitty, and is sent back to prison.
 The Weasel – The Weasel is a super diabolical villain. He targeted Dudley Puppy (who had placed him in prison) and Verminious Snaptrap (who once impersonated him) prompting Kitty Katswell to pose as their mother at Chief's version of a safe house. He did various attempts at Dudley and Snaptrap's lives which even included one where he went straight and gave them a jack-in-the-box bomb. After that attempt, Dudley and Kitty found the Weasel's house and were able to defeat him. The Weasel was imprisoned and became a cellmate of Snaptrap who was also arrested for looting the Weasel's house.
 Rumble Bee – The Rumble Bee is the older, and more evil, brother of Wanna-Bee. When Keswick accidentally created an army of mutant laser-firing bees (one of which was the Rumble Bee himself), he quickly became their leader. Wanna-Bee, resenting his brother for his accomplishments, joined T.U.F.F. in defeating him.
 The Overbear – The Overbear is a villain, known for his extremely overbearing personality. In "T.U.F.F. Break Up," The Chief asks him to help bring T.U.F.F. back together, as he was The Chief's former bowling partner, resulting in Dudley and Kitty retrieving Birdbrain's mayonnaise for him. He is then revealed to actually be evil, and using Birdbrain's "Obey-o-naise" to brainwash Petropolis. He was then defeated. He was only seen in "T.U.F.F. Break Up."

Citizens of Petropolis

 Peg Puppy (voiced by Leslie Carrara-Rudolph) – Peg is Dudley's over-protective mother. She once dated Snaptrap and the Chameleon. In "Mom-A-Geddon", she disapproves of Dudley's occupation, but after seeing him in action, allows him to keep his job. She thinks that Kitty is Dudley's secretary, and never gets her name right. She usually bothers Dudley when he's home. In "Snap Dad", she's shown to not have her husband after Dudley's father married her which means she's either divorced or widowed.
 Mrs. Katswell (voiced by Grey DeLisle) – Mrs. Katswell is Kitty's mother who first appeared in a flashback in "Operation: Happy Birthday". She somewhat resembles and even sounds like her daughter. In the episode "Diary of a Mad Cat", the Chameleon disguises himself as Kitty's mom and reveals that Kitty has a sister named Katty who is a criminal.
 Little – An unnamed, anthropomorphic young chipmunk who was a running gag throughout the episode "Mall Rat". She is depicted as being adorably innocent and sweet and her main purpose throughout the episode was to tug at Dudley's shirt after every time Kitty thwarted one of Snaptrap's unusual acts of kindness towards the townspeople and ask why Kitty performed the action that destroyed Snaptrap's most recent contribution. She also made an appearance in "Bored of Education" where members T.U.F.F appeared at an elementary school during "Career Day" in hopes of influencing the pupils to one day join either side. She appeared as a student at the school who was poorly influenced by the Chameleon (along with all of the other students) to grow up to perform acts of villainy, and she was included to be used for the same gag that had been done in the episode "Mall Rat". She is revealed to use her cute looks to make people do what she wants.
Mayor Teddy Bear – A bear who is the Mayor of Petropolis and had preceded the previously unnamed mayor that was seen in "Iron Mutt". His first name is actually "Mayor," and this led people to assume he was their mayor. He likes to share strange "fun facts" about himself, including that he can smell colors, (later saying that he was off his medicine) can cross his eyes backwards, and keeps chopped liver in the city safe.
 Rodger – Rodger is Dudley's friend. He was only shown once in "Mall Rat" for the punchline of a joke.
 General Warthog – A warthog who is the general of Petropolis' army.
 Wolf Spitzer (voiced by Daran Norris) – Wolf Spitzer is a gray wolf who is Petropolis local news reporter for KPET News. He is a parody of Wolf Blitzer.
 Eric (voiced by Daran Norris) – A buff cat who delivers the water to T.U.F.F. Kitty has a crush on him.
 Becky – A dog who manages loans at the First Petropolis Bank. Dudley has a crush on her, and in "Love Puppy," shields her from the blast from Bird Brain's "Lovey-Dovey-Kissy-Smoochy" gun and later returns her feelings to him.
 Bob Barky (voiced by Daran Norris) – A dog game show host who hosts various game shows in Petropolis. He is a parody of Bob Barker.
 Phil (voiced by Matt Taylor) – Phil is a bulldog who is Dudley's friend. He is never shown, but is described with something gross related to a wart or boil. His first appearance was in "Lie Like a Dog" where he is shown to live near the bus station and is implied by Dudley to have wealthy parents. In "Puppy Unplugged", Dudley revealed that Phil is married yet his wife hasn't been seen yet.
 Mr. Wong (voiced by Matt Taylor) – A duck who is the owner of "Wong's Chinese Buffet". He has a grudge against Dudley for eating ten thousand dollars' worth of food, and keeping his unfinished food in his shirt for later. He was also seen in "T.U.F.F. Break Up," renting out half of T.U.F.F. for his dry-cleaning business.

Production
Butch Hartman said that he created the central character and wanted to make a crime-fighting show based on him. Because his previous animated series Danny Phantom already involved superheroes, Hartman decided that he would focus on making Dudley a secret agent. He pitched the series to Nickelodeon as "Get Smart with a dog."

Eric Bauza, (who voices Foop in The Fairly OddParents and Leather Teddy in T.U.F.F. Puppy), was originally chosen to be the voice of Dudley Puppy, but the creators didn't feel that he was right for the character and Jerry Trainor was chosen instead.

The original title of the show was Stud Puppy.

Home media

Note: The episode "A Doomed Christmas" along with Christmas episodes of The Fairly OddParents and Fanboy & Chum Chum were supposed to be on the It's a SpongeBob Christmas! DVD, but they were dropped from the actual release. However, the Target exclusive of It's A SpongeBob Christmas! included the Christmas episodes of those shows on a bonus disc. It's currently unknown if Nickelodeon will ever announce a Season 3 DVD release.

Reception

Critical
Following the show's premiere, the series received mixed reviews.

Emily Ashby of Common Sense Media gave the series 2 out of 5 stars; criticizing the “iffy messages” the show sends to kids and the frequent use of name calling, but adding, “Kitty's attractive appearance and overly emotional response to Dudley's successes are memorable.”

Ratings
The series premiere of T.U.F.F. Puppy drew 3.6 million viewers.

Awards and nominations

References

External links
 
 

2010 American television series debuts
2015 American television series endings
2010s American animated television series
2010s Nickelodeon original programming
Animated television series about dogs
English-language television shows
Television series created by Butch Hartman
Fictional secret agents and spies
Nicktoons
American children's animated comedy television series
Annie Award winners